Richard Arthur Kleiner (March 9, 1921 – February 13, 2002) was an American columnist whose breezy question-and-answer column, "Ask Dick Kleiner," about Hollywood celebrities appeared in hundreds of newspapers across the country. He was also an author of books, a songwriter, and a voice actor.

Kleiner wrote about Broadway for fifteen years, then switched to covering Hollywood in 1964. He was syndicated by Newspaper Enterprise Association. Over the next twenty-five years, he interviewed thousands of stars and would-be stars. His books included Please Don't Shoot My Dog: The Autobiography of Jackie Cooper and The Two of Us, with Tony Martin and Cyd Charisse.

He wrote the lyrics for "Say Hey -- The Willie Mays Song" (with Jane Douglass White's music) and Pearl Bailey's "It'll Get Worse." He also provided the voice of one of the rats in The Secret of NIMH.

He began writing his thrice-weekly "Ask Dick Kleiner" column in 1975, responding to questions about celebrities, movies, and television from readers across the country. Although he retired from his other duties in 1989, he continued the column until December 2001.

Kleiner was married to Hortensia "Chicki" Kleiner and they had three children: Peter, Cindy, and Katherine.

References

See also
List of newspaper columnists

1921 births
2002 deaths
American columnists
American male journalists
Place of birth missing
Place of death missing